Official Secrets is a 2019 British drama film based on the case of whistleblower Katharine Gun, who leaked a memo exposing an illegal spying operation by American and British intelligence services to gauge sentiment of and potentially blackmail United Nations diplomats tasked to vote on a resolution regarding the 2003 invasion of Iraq. The film is directed by Gavin Hood, and Gun is portrayed by Keira Knightley. The film also stars Matt Smith, Matthew Goode, Adam Bakri, Indira Varma and Ralph Fiennes.

The film had its world premiere at the Sundance Film Festival on 28 January 2019 and was released in the United States on 30 August 2019, by IFC Films, and in the United Kingdom on 18 October 2019, by Entertainment One.

Plot
In early 2003, GCHQ analyst Katharine Gun obtains a memo detailing a joint United States and British operation to spy on diplomats from several non–permanent United Nations Security Council member states Cameroon, Chile, Bulgaria and Guinea in order to "dig dirt" on them and influence the Security Council into passing a resolution supporting an invasion of Iraq. Angered that the United Kingdom is being led into a war on false pretences, Katharine leaks the memo to a friend involved in the anti-war movement, who passes it to anti-war activist Yvonne Ridley, who in turn passes it to The Observer journalist Martin Bright.

The Observer foreign editor Peter Beaumont allows Martin to investigate the story in the interest of journalism. To verify the authenticity of the leaked memo, Martin enlists the help of the Observer's Washington, DC correspondent Ed Vulliamy in contacting the memo's author Frank Koza, the Chief of Staff at the "regional targets" section of the National Security Agency. Despite the Observer pro-war stance, Peter convinces the newspaper’s editor Roger Alton that the leaked memo is worth publishing.

The publication of the leaked memo in March 2003 generates considerable public and media interest. The Drudge Report attempts to discredit the document as a fake after a young staffer named Nicole Mowbray inadvertently changed the text from American to British English using spell check. However, Martin is able to produce the original memo, confirming its authenticity. Katharine's actions prompt GCHQ to launch an internal investigation. Seeking to prevent an invasion of Iraq and to protect her fellow GCHQ colleagues from prolonged suspicion, Katharine confesses to leaking the memo. She is arrested and detained for a night before being released on remand.

Following the outbreak of the Iraq War, Katharine seeks the services of the Liberty lawyers Ben Emmerson and Shami Chakrabarti. The British Government decides to charge her with violating the Official Secrets Act, tasking Director of Public Prosecutions Ken Macdonald with leading the prosecution. To exert pressure on her, the British authorities attempt to deport her husband Yasar Gun, a Turkish Kurd. However, Katharine is able to halt the deportation by presenting a marriage certificate proving the authenticity of her relationship.

Ben comes up with the defence strategy that Katharine was acting out of loyalty to her country by seeking to prevent the UK from being led into an unlawful war in Iraq. With the help of Martin, Ed, and former Foreign Office deputy legal adviser Elizabeth Wilmshurst, Ben discovers that the Attorney General Peter Goldsmith changed his position on the legality of the Iraq War after meeting with several lawyers from the Bush Administration.  Despite the odds stacked against them, Katharine refuses to plead guilty in exchange for a reduced charge.

On the day of the trial, the Crown prosecutor drops all charges against Katharine. Ben suggests to the court that this is because prosecuting her would have shown that the Blair government led the UK into war on false pretences. The film then mentions the human toll of the Iraq War and that Lord Goldsmith's advice on the illegality of the Iraq War was made public in 2010. The film ends with footage of Katharine addressing the media following the dismissal of her case and Ben shunning Ken for putting Katharine through the ordeal "to make an example of her".

Cast

Keira Knightley as Katharine Gun
Matt Smith as Martin Bright
Matthew Goode as Peter Beaumont
Rhys Ifans as Ed Vulliamy
Adam Bakri as Yasar Gun
Indira Varma as Shami Chakrabarti
Ralph Fiennes as Ben Emmerson
Conleth Hill as Roger Alton
Tamsin Greig as Elizabeth Wilmshurst
Hattie Morahan as Yvonne Ridley
Ray Panthaki as Kamal Ahmed
Angus Wright as Mark Ellison
Chris Larkin as Nigel Jones, Baron Jones of Cheltenham
Monica Dolan as Fiona Bygate
Jack Farthing as Andy Dumfries
Clive Francis as Admiral Nick Wilkinson
Katherine Kelly as Jacqueline / MI6 Agent 
John Heffernan as James Welch
Kenneth Cranham as Judge Hyam
Darrell D'Silva as Chilean Ambassador
Janie Dee as Jan Clements
MyAnna Buring as Jasmine
Niccy Lin as Mi-Yung
Chris Reilly as Jerry
Shaun Dooley as John
Peter Guinness as TinTin
Hanako Footman as Nicole Mowbray
Jeremy Northam as Ken Macdonald

Production
Sara and Gregory Bernstein had written a script already in 2008. Eventually it found itself on The Black List, a list of "most liked" screenplays that have not yet been produced, where director Debs Paterson saw it. Still, nothing came of it until January 2016, when a filming start in May was announced, with Harrison Ford, Anthony Hopkins, Paul Bettany, Natalie Dormer and Martin Freeman cast. Tahar Rahim and Gillian Anderson were cast during the 2016 Berlin International Film Festival. However by June 2017, filming had yet to begin, and cast member Anderson stated she had not heard anything about the project since being cast.

By January 2018, the project was redeveloped once more, with Gavin Hood now set to direct in place of Justin Chadwick, and Keira Knightley and Matt Smith cast in February, replacing the previous cast. In March, Ralph Fiennes and Matthew Goode joined the cast, with filming beginning on 12 March 2018 in Yorkshire. Filming took place in the village of Boston Spa on 14 March. Indira Varma, Conleth Hill and Tamsin Greig joined the cast the next day. Filming had moved to Manchester by 19 March, serving as a stand-in for London. Filming was undertaken in April 2018 in Liverpool's St George's Hall.
The beach scenes for the character played by Ralph Fiennes is at Thurstaston beach on the Dee Estuary of Wirral peninsula and prominently shows the cottage known locally as Sally's Cottage.

Release
The film had its world premiere at the Sundance Film Festival on 28 January 2019. Shortly after, IFC Films acquired US distribution rights to the film. It was released in the United States on 30 August 2019. It was previously scheduled to be released on 23 August 2019. and in the United Kingdom on 18 October 2019.

Reception

The website's critics consensus reads, "Official Secrets has a familiar structure and an obvious if worthy message, but rises on the strength of Keira Knightley's powerful performance." On Metacritic, the film holds 63 out of a 100 based on 28 reviews, indicating "generally favorable reviews". 

In an article about the film and Katharine Gun, Sam Husseini wrote that "having followed this story from the start, I find this film to be, by Hollywood standards, a remarkably accurate account of what has happened to date—'to date' because the wider story still isn’t really over".

Accolades

References

External links

2019 thriller drama films
Films shot in Greater Manchester
2010s spy films
2010s political films
British thriller drama films
British spy films
British political films
Films about whistleblowing
Films directed by Gavin Hood
Films set in 2003
Films set in 2004
Films set in London
Films set in Gloucestershire
Films shot in Lancashire
Films shot in Yorkshire
Entertainment One films
IFC Films films
Scanbox Entertainment films
British docudrama films
2019 drama films
2010s English-language films
2010s British films